Mary Ellen Bromfield (born Mary Ellen Tillotson on March 13, 1928) is an American actress, dancer, and writer.

Biography
Mary Bromfield was born in Fresno County, California to Frank and Edna Tillotson. She attended University of the Pacific in Stockton, California, receiving a Bachelor of Arts in Music.

Bromfield's early career consisted of dancing, where she became a popular headliner under the names Aleene Dupree  and Kalantan. She performed at various venues in Las Vegas, Nevada, New Orleans, Louisiana, and Mexico City, Mexico. She was given the name Kalantan which she used as her stage name for a while during the time she was in Mexico.

As Kalantan, she starred in her first film, Howard Hughes 1953 3D production Son of Sinbad.

Bromfield first wed hair stylist Adolfo Martinez in Mexico City, Mexico; they divorced. Later, she married actor John Bromfield in 1962. They remained married until his death in 2005. After marrying Bromfield, she retired from performing and did sales for a technology company. After his death, she delved into writing, and has published multiple novels, notably Gulls Haven. She published her autobiography, Kalantan: Behind the Curtain, in July 2016. An active author, she resides in Lake Havasu City, Arizona with her niece.

Filmography
 Son of Sinbad (1953)
 Midnight Frolics (1946)

Books
 Gulls Haven (2011)
 Kalantan: Behind the Curtain (2016)
 Stories of Crime (2016)
 The Murder of Ellena (2016)
 The Ghosts of Blue Manor (2017)
 Moss (2017)
 Tired (2018)
 I'm laughing (2018)
 It Happens (2018)
 The Specter (2018)
 Listen to the Quiet (2018)
 Wouldn't You Know (2019)
 The House On the Hill (2019)
 Asa Crow (2019)
 Fear (2020)
 No Time to Lose (2020)
 Sam: I am Woman (2021)

References

External links

1928 births
Living people
American actresses
American female dancers
American vedettes
American women writers
University of the Pacific (United States) alumni
American expatriates in Mexico